"Flowers in the Rain" is a song by English rock band The Move. The song was released as a single and reached number two in 1967 on the UK Singles Chart, and number four in Ireland.

It achieved its own place in pop history by being the first record to be played on BBC Radio 1 when the station was launched on 30 September 1967. (Technically, both George Martin's specially commissioned "Theme One" and Johnny Dankworth's "Beefeaters" were the first tracks to be heard on the station. "Beefeaters" was Tony Blackburn's theme tune for Daily Disc Delivery and so it was heard before "Flowers in the Rain".)

The song was written by the Move's guitarist/vocalist Roy Wood. As with many of Wood's early songs, the basis of "Flowers in the Rain" was a book of fairy tales which Wood authored while at The Moseley College of Art. The distinctive instrumental arrangement, including oboe, clarinet, cor anglais and French horn, was suggested by assistant producer Tony Visconti.

Promotional stunt
In a promotional stunt for the record — typical of the band's manager Tony Secunda — a postcard was released with a cartoon of a naked then-Prime Minister Harold Wilson in bed with his secretary Marcia Williams. Wilson sued, and the High Court ordered that all royalties from the song be donated to a charity of Wilson's choice. This legal arrangement remains in force to this day and is thought to have cost the group millions of pounds over the years. During the single's chart success, most of the money went to the Spastics Society and Stoke Mandeville Hospital. In the 1990s, The Observer newspaper reported the royalties had exceeded £200,000 and found that The Harold Wilson Charitable Trust had extended the range of beneficiaries to include, among others, the Oxford Operatic Society, Bolton Lads Club and the Jewish National Fund for Israel.

Personnel
 Carl Wayne – lead vocals
 Roy Wood – lead guitar, со-lead vocals
 Trevor Burton – rhythm guitar
 Ace Kefford – bass guitar 
 Bev Bevan – drums
 Tony Visconti – string arrangements

Charts

Covers
On 25 September 2007, BBC Radio 4 featured a programme called The Story of Flowers in the Rain, hosted by Tony Blackburn, on the court action and its related history, to celebrate the 40th anniversary of the song.

References

The Move songs
Songs written by Roy Wood
Psychedelic songs
Song recordings produced by Denny Cordell
1967 songs
Regal Zonophone Records singles
1967 singles
Songs involved in royalties controversies